Private Access (also known as Secret Access) is a 1989 Italian drama film directed by Francesco Maselli. For this film Ornella Muti was awarded with a Silver Ribbon for best actress.

References

External links

1989 films
1989 drama films
Italian drama films
Films directed by Francesco Maselli
1980s Italian-language films
1980s Italian films